Justin Meldal-Johnsen (born March 26, 1970) is an American musician, record producer, songwriter and musical director. He is best known for his work with artists such as Beck, Paramore, Nine Inch Nails, M83, Air, and St. Vincent.

Meldal-Johnsen served as the touring bassist, guitarist, and keyboardist for Nine Inch Nails between 2008 and 2009, and was Beck's bassist and musical director from 1996 until mid-2016. In 2021, he began work as a bassist, keyboardist and musical director for St. Vincent.

Other artists Meldal-Johnsen has worked with include Garbage, The Mars Volta, Frank Ocean, Dixie Chicks, Tori Amos, Dido, Charlotte Gainsbourg, Goldfrapp, Blood Orange, Pete Yorn, Turin Brakes, Marianne Faithfull and Ladytron. As a producer, Meldal-Johnsen has worked with M83, Paramore, Metric, Tegan and Sara, Deafheaven, Poppy, Jimmy Eat World, The Naked and Famous, School of Seven Bells, Neon Trees, Young the Giant, Ken Andrews, Division Day and more.

Musician career and history
Meldal-Johnsen grew up in Los Angeles, obsessively listening to his parents' records and received his first bass guitar at the age of twelve. Like most budding musicians, he spent his time playing along to his favorite bands' records and jamming in garages. His interests were wide, but centered on American post-punk (Hüsker Dü, Fugazi, The Minutemen, Sonic Youth) and UK post-punk, goth, and dream pop (Wire, Cocteau Twins, Gang of Four, Love and Rockets, Bauhaus, New Order, Joy Division). After high school at the age of seventeen, he worked the night shift as a janitor at Cherokee Recording Studios in Hollywood, looking in on late-night sessions, and occasionally invited to witness the proceedings.

In 1987 he met Beck, and the two would form a lasting friendship and shared musical interests that would eventually culminate in Justin joining Beck's touring band many years later. From 1988 to 1993, Meldal-Johnsen was in LA alternative rock bands Last Carousel and This Great Religion, with Tony Hoffer. In 1994, he joined the band Pet, which featured singer Lisa Papineau and guitarist Tyler Bates. Also in 1994, Meldal-Johnsen joined Los Angeles alt-noise band Medicine with Brad Laner, and recorded and toured with them until their eventual break-up in 1996. Laner and Meldal-Johnsen would continue to record and work together on projects such as Electric Company as well as Laner's various solo albums in years to come.

In early 1996, Beck asked Meldal-Johnsen to join his touring and recording band, which he was a member of from 1996 until leaving in May 2016, an announcement which was made during Beck's set at the Beale Street Music Festival during band introductions in a poignant send-off. He recorded with Beck on albums such as Odelay, Mutations, Midnite Vultures, Sea Change, Guero, The Information, Morning Phase, as well as a great quantity of hitherto unreleased material. 

In 1998, he joined up with French band Air for their Moon Safari tour, followed by the recording of their 2001 album 10 000 Hz Legend. In 2002, he helped to form the band Ima Robot, and On September 6, 2003, Ima Robot released their first full-length album, the self-titled Ima Robot. The album featured the singles "Dynomite" and "Song #1" (released in the UK only), and the band supported their album by touring worldwide with artists such as Hot Hot Heat, The Von Bondies, Jane's Addiction, The Sounds, and others. In 2006, he briefly joined Gnarls Barkley, acting as the musical director and assembling the touring band. He was involved in just two performances before re-joining with Beck: The Coachella Festival and a secret show at The Roxy in Hollywood.

In 2008, Meldal-Johnsen met with Trent Reznor and was invited to join the Nine Inch Nails touring band as bassist, guitarist, and keyboard player. Meldal-Johnsen spent the majority of 2008 to 2009 in Nine Inch Nails on their Lights in the Sky (2008), and NIN|JA / Wave Goodbye (2009) tours. In 2010, Beck asked Meldal-Johnsen back into the studio to contribute to a large body of work to be divided amongst multiple eventual releases. During the 2010s he also toured with Beck, but mainly focused on producing. In 2017, he was honored by the Fender Musical Instrument Corporation with the worldwide release his own signature instrument, the JMJ Road Worn Mustang Bass.  In 2021 he returned to performing in a new role as bassist, musical director, and synth player with St. Vincent, starting off with a performance on Saturday Night Live.

Producing career
Beginning in about 2005, Meldal-Johnsen thought that he may be able to parlay his extensive studio experience as a musician into the field of producing and engineering, something he had always had interest in. His first forays were exclusively co-productions, but beginning in 2009, he began to move forward as a full-fledged producer/co-writer/collaborator. This is seen most clearly with his production and writing on the acclaimed 2011 M83 album, Hurry Up, We're Dreaming. Today, Meldal-Johnsen spends most of his time producing and writing, working largely from his studio in Glendale, California.

In 2013, he produced Paramore's self-titled fourth album, and Young the Giant's album Mind Over Matter. As of Fall 2014, Meldal-Johnsen has worked with The Naked and Famous, School of Seven Bells, The Raveonettes, Metric and others in between tours with Beck.  He produced Wolf Alice ‘s sophomore album, Visions of a Life which won the Mercury Prize in 2018.

Credits

Production
2023 M83 - Fantasy
2022 Jimmy Eat World - Place Your Debts (single)
2022 Jimmy Eat World - Something Loud (single)
2022 Poppy - Pocket - song from the Stagger (EP))
2021 Poppy - Flux
2021 Deafheaven - Infinite Granite
2020 Best Coast - Always Tomorrow (album)
2020 Liza Anne - Desire (single)
2019 Jimmy Eat World - Surviving
2019 M83 – DSVII
2019 Liza Anne - Devotion (single)
2018 Metric - Art of Doubt
2017 Wolf Alice – Visions of a Life
2017 Paramore – After Laughter
2016 Jimmy Eat World – Integrity Blues
2016 M83 – Junk
2016 School of Seven Bells – SVIIB
2015 Yacht – I Thought the Future Would Be Cooler
2014 The Raveonettes – Pe'ahi
2014 Young the Giant – Mind over Matter
2013 Paramore – Paramore
2013 Tegan and Sara – Heartthrob
2012 Frankenweenie Unleashed! (Original Motion Picture Soundtrack)
2012 Neon Trees – Picture Show
2011 M83 – Hurry Up, We're Dreaming
2011 Moving Units - Tension War (EP)
2009 Division Day – Visitation
2008 The Informers – contributions to the score and Original Motion Picture Soundtrack
2007 Ken Andrews – Secrets of the Lost Satellite
2006 Holly Palmer – Songs for Tuesday

Songwriting
2022 Poppy - Pocket - song from the Stagger (EP)
2021 Poppy - Flux
2018 Metric – Art of Doubt
2016 M83 – Junk
2016 School of Seven Bells - SVIIB
2013 Paramore – Paramore
2011 M83 – Hurry Up, We're Dreaming
2010 The Switch – movie score
2008 The Informers – contributions to the score and Original Motion Picture Soundtrack
2007 Macy Gray – Big
2003 Macy Gray – The Trouble with Being Myself

Mixing
2018 Preoccupations - New Material (album)

Musician
2021 Deafheaven - Infinite Granite
2021 Garbage - No Gods No Masters
2020 Best Coast - Always Tomorrow
2020 Dixie Chicks - Gaslighter
2019 Drab Majesty - Modern Mirror
2019 M83 - DSVII
2019 Jimmy Eat World - Surviving
2019 Mike Patton & Jean-Claude Vannier – Corpse Flower
2019 The Bird and the Bee – Interpreting The Masters Volume 2: A Tribute to Van Halen
2018 Preoccupations - New Material
2017 Paramore – After Laughter
2017 Lawrence Rothman – The Book of Law
2016 M83 – Junk
2016 School of Seven Bells – SVIIB
2016 Edward Sharpe and the Magnetic Zeros – PersonA
2016 Air – Twentyears
2015 Frank Black – The Complete Recordings
2014 Young the Giant – Mind Over Matter
2014 Beck – Morning Phase
2013 Paramore – Paramore
2013 Drake – Nothing Was the Same
2013 Tegan and Sara – Heartthrob
2013 Classixx – Hanging Gardens
2013 Keaton Henson – Birthdays
2012 Frankenweenie Unleashed!
2012 Neon Trees – Picture Show
2012 Garbage – Not Your Kind of People
2012 Jason Mraz – Love Is a Four Letter Word
2011 M83 – Hurry Up, We're Dreaming
2011 Cass McCombs – Wit's End
2011 Serge Gainsbourg – Tribute at The Hollywood Bowl
2011 Blood Orange – Coastal Grooves
2011 Various Artists – Sucker Punch Soundtrack
2010 Adam Stevens – We Live on Cliffs
2010 Macy Gray – The Sellout
2010 Kid Rock – Born Free
2010 Sara Bareilles – Kaleidoscope Heart
2010 Pete Francis Heimbold – Movie We Are In
2010 Sons of Sylvia – Revelation
2010 Charlotte Gainsbourg – IRM
2009 Cory Chisel and The Wandering Sons – Death Won't Send a Letter
2009 Division Day – Visitation
2009 Pink – P!nk Box
2009 Christopher Young – The Informers Soundtrack
2008 Nine Inch Nails – The Slip (live rehearsal footage on the DVD content only; did not record the actual album)
2008 Daniel Martin Moore – Stray Age
2008 Goldfrapp – Seventh Tree
2008 Ladytron – Velocifero
2008 Dido – Safe Trip Home
2008 Jacob Abello – Nothing But Gold
2008 Beck – Odelay (Deluxe Edition)
2007 Emmylou Harris – Songbird: Rare Tracks and Forgotten Gems
2007 Ken Andrews – Secrets of the Lost Satellite
2007 Storm Large – Ladylike Side One
2007 They Might Be Giants – The Else
2007 Macy Gray – Big
2006 Ima Robot – Monument to the Masses
2006 Melissa McClelland – Thumbelina's One Night Stand
2006 Dixie Chicks – Taking the Long Way
2006 Beck – The Information
2006 Pink – I'm Not Dead
2006 Gran Bel Fisher – Full Moon Cigarette
2006 Toby Lightman – Bird on a Wire
2005 Charlotte Martin – Veins (EP)
2005 Judd and Maggie – Subjects
2005 Tom McRae – All Maps Welcome
2005 Gemma Hayes – The Roads Don't Love You
2005 Beck – Guero
2005 Garbage – Bleed Like Me
2005 The Black Eyed Peas – Monkey Business
2005 Nikka Costa – can'tneverdidnothin'
2004 Peter Walker – Landed
2004 Charlotte Martin – On Your Shore
2005 Rob Thomas – ...Something to Be
2004 Courtney Love – America's Sweetheart
2003 Jessy Moss - Street Knuckles
2003 Lisa Marie Presley - To Whom It May Concern
2003 Charlotte Martin - In Parentheses (EP)
2003 Michelle Branch – Hotel Paper
2003 The Mars Volta – De-Loused in the Comatorium
2003 Macy Gray – The Trouble with Being Myself
2003 Ima Robot – Ima Robot
2003 Turin Brakes – Ether Song
2003 Pete Yorn – Day I Forgot
2003 Tori Amos – Tales of a Librarian
2003 Nelly Furtado – Folklore
2002 Linkin Park – "My December"
2002 Scapegoat Wax – SWAX
2002 Mark Eitzel – Music for Courage and Confidence
2002 Brad Mehldau – Largo
2002 Ladytron – Light & Magic
2002 Beck – Sea Change
2002 Mark Eitzel – Music for Courage and Confidence
2002 Marianne Faithfull – Kissin Time
2002 Air (as Rainbow Brothers) – 818.323.01
2002 Tori Amos – Scarlet's Walk
2001 Érica Garcia – Amorama
2001 Big Sir – Now That's What I Call Big Sir
2001 Air – 10 000 Hz Legend
2001 Tori Amos – Strange Little Girls
2000 Ike Riley – Salesmen and Racists
2000 On – Shifting Skin
2000 Beck – Midnite Vultures
2000 Beck – Farm Aid: Keep America Growing, Vol. 1
2000 Logan's Sanctuary – soundtrack album
1999 Jude – No One Is Really Beautiful
1999 Jamiroquai – "Black Capricorn Day"
1999 Beck – More Oar: A Tribute to the Skip Spence Album
1999 Beck – Sin City - A Tribute to Gram Parsons
1999 Beck – Mixed Bizness
1999 Blinker the Star – August Everywhere
1998 Amnesia – Lingus
1998 Electric Company – Studio City
1998 Beck – Mutations
1998 Tori Amos – From the Choirgirl Hotel
1998 Barbie, Christe and Teresa – Beyond Pink
1997 Moby – That's When I Reach for My Revolver
1997 Beck – The Little Drum Machine Boy
1997 Beck – Electric Music and the Summer People
1996 The Elastic Purejoy – The Clutter of Pop
1996 Pet – Pet
1996 Tori Amos – Hey Jupiter
1996 Billy White Acre – Billy's Not Bitter
1995 Electric Company – Live in Concert
1995 Medicine – Her Highness
1993 Circle of Power – Circle of Power

Other
The Informers Original Motion Picture Soundtrack (music supervisor, composer)
Californication – bass guitar during musical score during Seasons 1, 2, 3, and 6, as well as bass guitar on the shows musical theme song, "Hank's Theme".
The Devil's Rejects - played bass on the score.
30 Days of Night - musician on the score.
 Halloween II - played bass on the score.

References

Sources
 Bass Player October 2008, pp. 26–35, 86

External links
 
 Official Website
 Interview with Bassist January 2000

Living people
1970 births
All articles with unsourced statements
Musicians from Eugene, Oregon
Nine Inch Nails members
American rock bass guitarists
American male bass guitarists
Alternative rock bass guitarists
Guitarists from Oregon
21st-century American bass guitarists
Businesspeople from Eugene, Oregon